The Dolphin 15 Senior, sometimes referred to as just the Dolphin Senior, is an American sailing dinghy that was designed by brothers Glenn Corcoran and Murray Corcoran and first built in 1964.

Production
The design was built by Silverline Boats in Moorhead, Minnesota, United States, until 1980 when the company closed. Production was then assumed by the Dolphin Sailboat Company of Independence, Missouri from 1981 to 1985 when it ceased business. The boat design is now out of production.

Design
The Dolphin 15 Senior is a recreational sailboat, built predominantly of fiberglass. It has a lateen rig, a spooned, raked stem, a vertical transom, a rounded, transom-hung rudder controlled by a tiller and a retractable fiberglass daggerboard. The rudder is fiberglass, with an aluminum head. The boat displaces .

For sailing the design has hiking bars, a high freeboard and a molded splashguard in front of the mast. It has a small, square, open stowage compartment molded into the hull, just aft of the mast.

The design has a Portsmouth Yardstick racing average handicap of 106.2 and is normally raced by one sailor.

Operational history
In a 1994 review Richard Sherwood notes that the, "Dolphin is a lateen-rigged cat board boat, slightly longer than most. Capacity for reasonable sailing is two adults."

Randle B. Moore wrote about the design in 2011, saying, "the Dolphin Senior is one of many small sailboats patterned after the world's most produced boat, the Sunfish. The Dolphin is slightly larger than a Sunfish and will hold two full size adults easily."

See also
List of sailing boat types

Similar sailboats
Phantom 14
Sunfish (sailboat)

References

Dinghies
1960s sailboat type designs
Sailboat type designs by Glenn Corcoran
Sailboat type designs by Murray Corcoran
Sailboat types built by Silverline Boats
Sailboat types built by Dolphin Sailboat Company